Obi Nwakanma is a Nigerian poet, literary critic, journalist and academic at the University of Central Florida. He writes a regular Sunday column on Vanguard Newspaper called The Orbit.  His works have also appeared in The Punch, ThisDay and TheCable.

Biography
Nwakanma was born in Ibadan, Nigeria. He was educated at Government College, Umuahia. He studied English at the University of Jos, and poetry at Washington University in St. Louis where he received his Masters in Fine Art. He further went to Saint Louis University in St. Louis, Missouri where he got his Ph.D. He is currently a professor at  University of Central Florida.

Bibliography
The Horsemen And Other Poems
Christopher Okigbo 1930-67: Thirsting for Sunlight
Birthcry

References

Nigerian poets
Igbo educators
Igbo writers
1966 births
Living people
University of Jos alumni
Washington University in St. Louis alumni
Saint Louis University alumni